The following people, military units, and groups have received the Freedom of the City of Newcastle upon Tyne.

Individuals

17th Century
 William Cavendish, 1st Duke of Newcastle : September 1642.
 Sir George Baker: September 1643.
 Sir William Armine : April 1645.
 Richard Barvis: April 1645.
 Robert Fenwick: April 1645.
 Sir Arthur Haselrig : September 1649.
 Edmon Styole: January 1652.    
 John Rushforth: August 1652.
 Mr. Sidenham: November 1652.
 Thomas Bantiff: January 1653.
 William Hilton: August 1654.
 Colonel Charles Howard: January 1655.
 Sir Thomas Widdrington: September 1657.  
 Thomas Parles: February 1660.
 Francis Nicholls: July 1660.
 Colonel Sir Edward Villiers: September 1662.
 Sir William Forster: September 1665.
 Henry Cavendish, Earl of Ogle: June 1667.
 John Maitland, 1st Duke of Lauderdale : October 1672.
 James Aire: December 1672.
 John Cockburn: April 1674. 
 William Lilburne: July 1674.
 George Johnson: September 1674.
 Lionell Vane: August 1681.
 Robert Mitford: October 1681.
 William Ramsay: September 1683.
 Henry Lambton: September 1685.
 George Johnson: September 1696.
 Sir St John Conyers : September 1697.
 Sir Baldwin Conyers : September 1697.
 John Ord: October 1699.

18th Century
 John Cuthbert: September 1707.
 Martin Bryson: January 1725.
 Richard Lumley, 2nd Earl of Scarbrough : July 1733.
 William Anysley: July 1737.
 Edward Collingwood: September 1738.
 Thomas Lumley-Saunderson, 3rd Earl of Scarbrough : September 1742.
 James Lumley : September 1742.
 Hugh Percy, 1st Duke of Northumberland : May 1753.
 William Pitt : April 1757.
 Henry Bilson-Legge : April 1757.
 William Gibson: September 1760.
 Prince Henry, Duke of Cumberland and Strathearn: August 1771.
 Christopher Fawcett: October 1771.
 Prince Frederick, Duke of York and Albany: June 1795.
 Prince William Henry, Duke of Gloucester and Edinburgh: June 1796.

19th Century
 Hugh Percy, 3rd Duke of Northumberland : June 1818.
 Prince Augustus Frederick, Duke of Sussex: August 1822.
 Field Marshal Arthur Wellesley, 1st Duke of Wellington : September 1827.
 Charles Vane, 3rd Marquess of Londonderry : November 1827.
 James Losh: January 1833.
 Sir William George Armstrong : September 1886.
 Sir Henry Morton Stanley : May 1890.
 Sir Charles Frederick Hamond: October 1890.
 William Ewart Gladstone : August 1891.
 Field Marshal Lord Roberts of Kandahar : January 1894.
 Field Marshal Garnet Wolseley, 1st Viscount Wolseley : July 1899.

20th Century
 William Watson-Armstrong, 1st Baron Armstrong : May 1901.
 Lieutenant General Robert Baden-Powell, 1st Baron Baden-Powell : March 1903.
 Alexander Laing: September 1904.
 Sir Henry William Newton: October 1906.
 William John Sanderson: March 1909.
 Thomas Richardson: May 1909.
 Sir Andrew Noble : June 1910.
 Sir William Haswell Stephenson : October 1910.
 Thomas Burt: November 1911.
 Sir Joseph Baxter Ellis: December 1912.
 Sir Edward Grey : October 1913.
 Sir Charles Algernon Parsons : March 1914.
 Sir Joseph Swan : March 1914.
 Field Marshal Jan Smuts : October 1917.
 David Lloyd George : September 1918.
 Major General  Sir Robert Arundel Kerr Montgomery : February 1919.
 Admiral of the Fleet David Beatty, 1st Earl Beatty : April 1919.
 Field Marshal Douglas Haig, 1st Earl Haig : April 1919.
 Marshal Ferdinand Foch: April 1919.
 Admiral of the Fleet Lord Jellicoe of Scapa : October 1925.
 John Henry Watson: May 1926.
 Arthur Henderson : July 1930.
 Sir George Lunn : July 1930.
 Hugh Morton : July 1930.
 Sir Arthur Munro Sutherland : May 1936.
 George Lansbury : May 1936.
 Sir Arthur Maule Oliver : June 1937.
 William Bramble : July 1939.
 Sir Charles Wothington Craven : July 1939.
 Richard Mayne : March 1940.
 David Adams : March 1940.
 John Chapman : December 1957.
 William McKeag : December 1966.
 Violet Hardisty Grantham: December 1966.
 Dame Catherine Campbell Scott : December 1966.
 Gladys Robson : December 1966.
 King Olav V of Norway: September 1968.
 President James Earl Carter Jr.: May 1977.
 Cardinal Basil Hume OSB OM: January 1980.
 Professor Sir John Walton : January 1980.
 Colonel George Brown : January 1980.
 John Edward Thompson Milburn: January 1980.
 Councillor Henry Russell: January 1980.
 Councillor Arthur Grey : January 1980.
 Councillor Margaret Collins : January 1980.
 Councillor Thomas Watson Collins : January 1980.
 Daisy Dorothy Clarke : June 1982.
 David Scott Cowper : June 1982.
 Nelson Mandela: April 1986.
 Andrei Sakharov: April 1986.
 Robert Frederick Zenon Geldof : April 1986.
 Peter Taylor, Baron Taylor of Gosforth : July 1992.
 Lord Beecham : April 1995.
 Councillor Theresa Science Russell: April 1998.

21st Century
 Harriet Jean Dunlop: February 2000.
 Dillan Richard Horsburgh: February 2000.
 Nathan Lee Douglas: February 2000.
 Lewis John White: February 2000.
 Kieran Paul Crump: February 2000.
 Jordan Rose Nicholson: February 2000.
 Rachel Isobel Somerville: February 2000.
 Nicholas Hugh Brown: December 2000.
 Edward Short, Baron Glenamara : December 2000.
 Alan Shearer : December 2000.
 Jonathan Edwards : December 2000.
 Jonathan Peter Wilkinson : December 2003.
 Sir Robert William Robson : March 2005.
 Harry Woolf, Baron Woolf : May 2006.
 Hari Shukla : May 2006.
 King Harald V of Norway: November 2008.
 Aung San Suu Kyi: March 2011. (Revoked in February 2018 by unanimous vote of the Newcastle City Council).
 Professor Peter Higgs : September 2013.
 Brendan Foster : February 2016.
 Sir Terry Farrell : February 2016.
 Sir Leonard Fenwick : May 2016. 
 Olivia Grant : May 2016.
 Professor Chris Brink : September 2016.
 Michael Harrison: February 2017.
 Freddy Shepherd: April 2017.
 Bruce Shepherd: April 2017.
 The Right Reverend Christine Hardman: 21 November 2021.
 Neil Shaka Hislop CM: 13 May 2022.
 Stevie Wonder: 1 March 2023.

Military Units
 The Royal Northumberland Fusiliers: February 1948.
 The Royal Regiment of Fusiliers: 1968.
 The Northumberland Hussars: January 1969.
 The Queen's Own Yeomanry: 1971.
 The 15th/19th The King's Royal Hussars: May 1972.
 HMS Newcastle, RN: March 1978.
 101st (Northumbrian) Regiment Royal Artillery: January 1980.
 201 (Northern) Field Hospital (Volunteers) RAMC: July 1984.
 The Royal Naval Reserve (Tyne Division): October 1985.
 The Royal Marines: July 1989.
 The St John Ambulance (Northumbria): July 1989.
 RAF Boulmer: February 2017.

Organizations and Groups
 Citizens of Newcastle upon Tyne who volunteered and served with the British Army in the South African War: August 1901.
 Newcastle United Football Club: May 1993.
 The Royal Shakespeare Company: October 1997.
 The Sage Group plc: December 2000.
 Greggs plc: September 2009.
 The Little Sisters of the Poor: February 2017.

References

External links
 Freedom of the City list

Newcastle upon Tyne
Newcastle upon Tyne